Good vs. Evil II: The Red Empire is the fourth studio album by American rapper KXNG Crooked (formerly known as Crooked I). The album was released on December 8, 2017 through C.O.B. LLC and Empire Distribution. The album features guest appearances by Royce da 5'9", Styles P, Jay Townsend, among others.

Background
On March 20, 2017, Crooked I posted an image via social media with the caption "Burnin incense to set the vibe.. GVE2", which suggested a sequel to his previous album Good vs Evil. On March 28, 2017, Crooked I confirmed on Twitter that his upcoming album would indeed be a sequel to Good vs. Evil. In an interview with XXL Magazine, Crooked I stated that the new record will be more politically-driven in comparison to the album's predecessor, with lyrics dealing with subjects such as social injustice, racism, classism, and consumerism. The album's cover art features United States president Donald Trump kneeling before a committee of people such as Adolf Hitler, Joseph Stalin, and Bin Laden.

The album's lead single, "Truth (Why You Mad)", featuring Royce da 5'9", was released on October 25, 2017. The cover art and tracklist for the album were revealed the same day. The second single, "The MAGA Continues", was released on November 22, 2017.

Critical reception
Good vs. Evil II: The Red Empire received generally positive reviews from critics. At the music website HotNewHipHop, the album received an average score of 4.2 out of 5 stars (83%), based on 15 reviews.

Track listing

References

2017 albums
Crooked I albums
Empire Distribution albums